South Carolina Highway 340 (SC 340) is a  state highway in the U.S. state of South Carolina. The highway connects the Timmonsville area with Darlington.

Route description
SC 340 begins at an intersection with SC 403 (Oates Highway) north-northwest of Timmonsville, within Darlington County. It travels to the northeast and crosses Middle Swamp and Myrtle Branch before an interchange with Interchange 20 (I-20). It crosses over Jeffries Creek and High Hill Creek before entering the city limits of Darlington. There, it intersects U.S. Route 52 (US 52; Governor Williams Highway). It crosses some railroad tracks before it meets its northern terminus, an intersection with SC 34 (Pearl Street).

Major intersections

See also

References

External links

SC 340 South Carolina Hwy Index

340
Transportation in Darlington County, South Carolina
Darlington, South Carolina